Approval voting is an electoral system in which voters can select many candidates instead of selecting only one candidate.

Description 
Approval voting ballots show a list of the options of candidates running. Approval voting lets each voter indicate support for one or more candidates. Final tallies show how many votes each candidate received, and the winner is the candidate with the most support.

Effect on elections 
Approval voting advocates Steven Brams and Dudley R. Herschbach predict that approval voting should increase voter participation, prevent minor-party candidates from being spoilers, and reduce negative campaigning. FairVote published a position paper arguing that approval voting has three flaws that undercut it as a method of voting and political vehicle (the group instead advocates for Instant-runoff voting). They argue that it can result in the defeat of a candidate who would win an absolute majority in a plurality election, can allow a candidate to win who might not win any support in a plurality election, and has incentives for tactical voting. The first two "flaws" are considered advantages by advocates of approval voting, as it chooses centrist candidates with broad appeal rather than polarizing candidates who appeal only to the majority. The Center for Election Science also points out that any voting method is subject to tactical voting with more than two candidates, as pointed out in Gibbard's theorem.

One study showed that approval voting would not have chosen the same two winners as plurality voting (Chirac and Le Pen) in France's presidential election of 2002 (first round) – it instead would have chosen Chirac and Jospin as the top two to proceed to a runoff. Le Pen lost by a very high margin in the runoff, 82.2% to 17.8%, a sign that the true top two had not been found. Straight approval voting without a runoff, from the study, still would have selected Chirac, but with an approval percentage of only 36.7%, compared to Jospin at 32.9%. Le Pen, in that study, would have received 25.1%. In the real primary election, the top three were Chirac, 19.9%, Le Pen, 16.9%, and Jospin, 16.2%. A study of various "evaluative voting" methods (approval voting and score voting) during the French presidential election, 2012 showed that "unifying" candidates tended to do better, and polarizing candidates did worse, via the evaluative voting methods than via the plurality system.

A generalized version of the Burr dilemma applies to approval voting when two candidates are appealing to the same subset of voters.  Although approval voting differs from the voting system used in the Burr dilemma, approval voting can still leave candidates and voters with the generalized dilemma of whether to compete or cooperate.

While in the modern era there have been relatively few competitive approval voting elections where tactical voting is more likely, Brams argues that approval voting usually elects Condorcet winners in practice.

Operational Impacts 

 Simple to tally—Approval ballots can be counted by some existing machines designed for plurality elections, as ballots are cast, so that final tallies are immediately available after the election, with relatively few if any upgrades to equipment.
 Just one round—Approval voting can remove the need for multiple rounds of voting, such as a primary or a run-off, simplifying the election process.

Usage

Current
The Latvian parliament uses approval voting within open list proportional representation. 

In 2018, Fargo, North Dakota, passed a local ballot initiative adopting approval voting for the city's local elections, and it was used to elect officials in June 2020, becoming the first United States city and jurisdiction to adopt approval voting.

In November 2020, St. Louis, Missouri, passed Proposition D to authorize a variant of approval voting (as unified primary) for municipal offices.

History 

Robert J. Weber coined the term "approval voting" in 1971. It was more fully published in 1978 by political scientist Steven Brams and mathematician Peter Fishburn.

Historically, several voting methods that incorporate aspects of approval voting have been used:

 Approval voting was used for papal conclaves between 1294 and 1621, with an average of about forty cardinals engaging in repeated rounds of voting until one candidate was listed on at least two-thirds of ballots.
 In the 13th through 18th centuries, the Republic of Venice elected the Doge of Venice using a multi-stage process that featured random selection and voting that allowed approval of multiple candidates and required a supermajority.
 According to Steven J. Brams, approval voting was used for unspecified elections in 19th century England.
 The selection of the Secretary-General of the United Nations has involved "straw poll" rounds of approval polling to help discover and build a consensus before a formal vote is held in the Security Council. The United Nations Secretary-General selection, 2006 indicated that South Korean Foreign Minister Ban Ki-moon was the only candidate to be acceptable to all five permanent members of the Security Council, which led to the withdrawal of India's Shashi Tharoor, who had the highest overall approval rate.
Approval voting was used in Greek legislative elections from 1864 to 1923, when it was replaced with proportional representation.

Political organizations and jurisdictions 
Approval voting has been used in privately administered nomination contests by the Independent Party of Oregon in 2011, 2012, 2014, and 2016. Oregon is a fusion voting state, and the party has cross-nominated legislators and statewide officeholders using this method; its 2016 presidential preference primary did not identify a potential nominee due to no candidate earning more than 32% support. The party switched to using STAR voting in 2020.

It is also used in internal elections by the American Solidarity Party, the Green Parties of Texas and Ohio, the Libertarian National Committee, the Libertarian parties of Texas, Colorado, Arizona, and New York, the US Modern Whig party, Alliance 90/The Greens in Germany, and the Czech and German Pirate Party.

In 2018, Fargo, North Dakota passed a ballot initiative adopting approval voting for local elections, becoming the first U.S. city and jurisdiction to adopt approval voting. (Previously in 2015, a Fargo city commissioner election had suffered from six-way vote-splitting, resulting in a candidate winning with an unconvincing 22% plurality of the vote.) 

The first election was held June 9, 2020, selecting two city commissioners, from seven candidates on the ballot.  Both winners received over 50% approval, with an average 2.3 approvals per ballot, and 62% of voters supported the change to approval voting in a poll. A poll by opponents of approval voting was conducted to test whether voters had in fact voted strategically according to the Burr dilemma. They found that 30% of voters who bullet voted did so for strategic reasons, while 57% did so because it was their sincere opinion. Fargo's second Approval election took place in June 2022, for mayor and city commission. The incumbent mayor was re-elected with an estimated 65% approval, with voters expressing 1.6 approvals per ballot. 

In 2020, St. Louis, Missouri passed an initiative to adopt approval voting followed by a top-two runoff (see Unified primary), thus becoming the second U.S. city to adopt approval voting and the first to use a variant of it.  The first such primary was held in March 2021, with voters expressing 1.1 to 1.6 approvals per ballot, in races with more than two candidates.

Other organizations 
The idea of approval was adopted by X. Hu and Lloyd Shapley in 2003 in studying authority distribution in organizations.

Approval voting has been adopted by several societies: the Society for Social Choice and Welfare (1992), Mathematical Association of America (1986), the American Mathematical Society, the Institute of Management Sciences (1987) (now the Institute for Operations Research and the Management Sciences), the American Statistical Association (1987), and the Institute of Electrical and Electronics Engineers (1987). The IEEE board in 2002 rescinded its decision to use approval voting. IEEE Executive Director Daniel J. Senese stated that approval voting was abandoned because "few of our members were using it and it was felt that it was no longer needed." Because none of these associations report results to their members and the public, it is difficult to evaluate Senese's claim and whether it is also true of other associations; Steven Brams' analysis of the 5-candidate 1987 Mathematical Association of America presidential election shows that 79% of voters cast a ballot for one candidate, 16% for 2 candidates, 5% for 3, and 1% for 4, with the winner earning the approval of 1,267 (32%) of 3,924 voters.

Approval voting also can be used in social scenarios as a fairer, but still quick system compared to a First-Past-The-Post equivalent, being able to avoid a spoiler effect while being very quick to calculate.

See also: Multiwinner approval voting.

Strategic voting

Overview 
Approval voting allows voters to select all the candidates whom they consider to be reasonable choices.

Strategic approval voting differs from ranked voting (aka preferential voting) methods where voters might reverse the preference order of two options, which if done on a larger scale can cause an unpopular candidate to win. Strategic Approval voting, with more than two options, involves the voter changing their approval threshold. The voter decides which options to give the same rating, even if they were to have a preference order between them. This leaves a tactical concern any voter has for approving their second-favorite candidate, in the case that there are three or more candidates.  Approving their second-favorite means the voter harms their favorite candidate's chance to win.  Not approving their second-favorite means the voter helps the candidate they least desire to beat their second-favorite and perhaps win.

Approval voting allows for bullet voting and compromising, while it is immune to push-over and burying.

Bullet Voting occurs when a voter approves only candidate "a" instead of both "a" and "b" for the reason that voting for "b" can cause "a" to lose. The voter would be satisfied with either "a" or "b" but has a moderate preference for "a". Were "b" to win, this hypothetical voter would still be satisfied. If supporters of both "a" and "b" do this, it could cause candidate "c" to win. This creates the "chicken dilemma", as supporters of "a" and "b" are playing chicken as to which will stop strategic voting first, before both of these candidates lose.

Compromising occurs when a voter approves an additional candidate who is otherwise considered unacceptable to the voter to prevent an even worse alternative from winning.

Sincere voting 

Approval voting experts describe sincere votes as those "... that directly reflect the true preferences of a voter, i.e., that do not report preferences 'falsely.  They also give a specific definition of a sincere approval vote in terms of the voter's ordinal preferences as being any vote that, if it votes for one candidate, it also votes for any more preferred candidate.  This definition allows a sincere vote to treat strictly preferred candidates the same, ensuring that every voter has at least one sincere vote. The definition also allows a sincere vote to treat equally preferred candidates differently.  When there are two or more candidates, every voter has at least three sincere approval votes to choose from.  Two of those sincere approval votes do not distinguish between any of the candidates: vote for none of the candidates and vote for all of the candidates.  When there are three or more candidates, every voter has more than one sincere approval vote that distinguishes between the candidates.

Examples 

Based on the definition above, if there are four candidates, A, B, C, and D, and a voter has a strict preference order, preferring A to B to C to D, then the following are the voter's possible sincere approval votes:
vote for A, B, C, and D
vote for A, B, and C
vote for A and B
vote for A
vote for no candidates

If the voter instead equally prefers B and C, while A is still the most preferred candidate and D is the least preferred candidate, then all of the above votes are sincere and the following combination is also a sincere vote:
vote for A and C

The decision between the above ballots is equivalent to deciding an arbitrary "approval cutoff." All candidates preferred to the cutoff are approved, all candidates less preferred are not approved, and any candidates equal to the cutoff may be approved or not arbitrarily.

Sincere strategy with ordinal preferences 

A sincere voter with multiple options for voting sincerely still has to choose which sincere vote to use. Voting strategy is a way to make that choice, in which case strategic approval voting includes sincere voting, rather than being an alternative to it. This differs from other voting systems that typically have a unique sincere vote for a voter.

When there are three or more candidates, the winner of an approval voting election can change, depending on which sincere votes are used. In some cases, approval voting can sincerely elect any one of the candidates, including a Condorcet winner and a Condorcet loser, without the voter preferences changing.  To the extent that electing a Condorcet winner and not electing a Condorcet loser is considered desirable outcomes for a voting system, approval voting can be considered vulnerable to sincere, strategic voting.  In one sense, conditions where this can happen are robust and are not isolated cases.  On the other hand, the variety of possible outcomes has also been portrayed as a virtue of approval voting, representing the flexibility and responsiveness of approval voting, not just to voter ordinal preferences, but cardinal utilities as well.

Dichotomous preferences 

Approval voting avoids the issue of multiple sincere votes in special cases when voters have dichotomous preferences. For a voter with dichotomous preferences, approval voting is strategy-proof (also known as strategy-free).  When all voters have dichotomous preferences and vote the sincere, strategy-proof vote, approval voting is guaranteed to elect the Condorcet winner, if one exists.  However, having dichotomous preferences when there are three or more candidates is not typical.  It is an unlikely situation for all voters to have dichotomous preferences when there are more than a few voters.

Having dichotomous preferences means that a voter has bi-level preferences for the candidates.  All of the candidates are divided into two groups such that the voter is indifferent between any two candidates in the same group and any candidate in the top-level group is preferred to any candidate in the bottom-level group.  A voter that has strict preferences between three candidates—prefers A to B and B to C—does not have dichotomous preferences.

Being strategy-proof for a voter means that there is a unique way for the voter to vote that is a strategically best way to vote, regardless of how others vote. In approval voting, the strategy-proof vote, if it exists, is a sincere vote.

Approval threshold 

Another way to deal with multiple sincere votes is to augment the ordinal preference model with an approval or acceptance threshold.  An approval threshold divides all of the candidates into two sets, those the voter approves of and those the voter does not approve of.  A voter can approve of more than one candidate and still prefer one approved candidate to another approved candidate.  Acceptance thresholds are similar.  With such a threshold, a voter simply votes for every candidate that meets or exceeds the threshold.

With threshold voting, it is still possible to not elect the Condorcet winner and instead elect the Condorcet loser when they both exist.  However, according to Steven Brams, this represents a strength rather than a weakness of approval voting.  Without providing specifics, he argues that the pragmatic judgements of voters about which candidates are acceptable should take precedence over the Condorcet criterion and other social choice criteria.

Strategy with cardinal utilities 

Voting strategy under approval is guided by two competing features of approval voting.  On the one hand, approval voting fails the later-no-harm criterion, so voting for a candidate can cause that candidate to win instead of a candidate more preferred by that voter.  On the other hand, approval voting satisfies the monotonicity criterion, so not voting for a candidate can never help that candidate win, but can cause that candidate to lose to a less preferred candidate.  Either way, the voter can risk getting a less preferred election winner.  A voter can balance the risk-benefit trade-offs by considering the voter's cardinal utilities, particularly via the von Neumann–Morgenstern utility theorem, and the probabilities of how others vote.

A rational voter model described by Myerson and Weber specifies an approval voting strategy that votes for those candidates that have a positive prospective rating.  This strategy is optimal in the sense that it maximizes the voter's expected utility, subject to the constraints of the model and provided the number of other voters is sufficiently large.

An optimal approval vote always votes for the most preferred candidate and not for the least preferred candidate.  However, an optimal vote can require voting for a candidate and not voting for a more preferred candidate if there 4 candidates or more.

Other strategies are also available and coincide with the optimal strategy in special situations.  For example:
 Vote for the candidates that have above average utility.  This strategy coincides with the optimal strategy if the voter thinks that all pairwise ties are equally likely
 Vote for any candidate that is more preferred than the expected winner and also vote for the expected winner if the expected winner is more preferred than the expected runner-up.  This strategy coincides with the optimal strategy if there are three or fewer candidates or if the pivot probability for a tie between the expected winner and expected runner-up is sufficiently large compared to the other pivot probabilities. This strategy, if used by all voters implies at equilibrium the election of the Condorcet winner whenever it exists.
Vote for the most preferred candidate only.  This strategy coincides with the optimal strategy when there is only one candidate with a positive prospective rating.

Another strategy is to vote for the top half of the candidates, the candidates that have an above-median utility. When the voter thinks that others are balancing their votes randomly and evenly, the strategy maximizes the voter's power or efficacy, meaning that it maximizes the probability that the voter will make a difference in deciding which candidate wins.

Optimal strategic approval voting fails to satisfy the Condorcet criterion and can elect a Condorcet loser.  Strategic approval voting can guarantee electing the Condorcet winner in some special circumstances.  For example, if all voters are rational and cast a strategically optimal vote based on a common knowledge of how all the other voters vote except for small-probability, statistically independent errors in recording the votes, then the winner will be the Condorcet winner, if one exists.

Strategy examples 
In the example election described here, assume that the voters in each faction share the following von Neumann–Morgenstern utilities, fitted to the interval between 0 and 100.  The utilities are consistent with the rankings given earlier and reflect a strong preference each faction has for choosing its city, compared to weaker preferences for other factors such as the distance to the other cities.

Using these utilities, voters choose their optimal strategic votes based on what they think the various pivot probabilities are for pairwise ties.  In each of the scenarios summarized below, all voters share a common set of pivot probabilities.

In the first scenario, voters all choose their votes based on the assumption that all pairwise ties are equally likely.  As a result, they vote for any candidate with an above-average utility.  Most voters vote for only their first choice.  Only the Knoxville faction also votes for its second choice, Chattanooga.  As a result, the winner is Memphis, the Condorcet loser, with Chattanooga coming in second place.  In this scenario, the winner has minority approval (more voters disapproved than approved) and all the others had even less support, reflecting the position that no choice gave an above-average utility to a majority of voters.

In the second scenario, all of the voters expect that Memphis is the likely winner, that Chattanooga is the likely runner-up, and that the pivot probability for a Memphis-Chattanooga tie is much larger than the pivot probabilities of any other pair-wise ties.  As a result, each voter votes for any candidate they prefer more than the leading candidate, and also vote for the leading candidate if they prefer that candidate more than the expected runner-up. Each remaining scenario follows a similar pattern of expectations and voting strategies.

In the second scenario, there is a three-way tie for first place.  This happens because the expected winner, Memphis, was the Condorcet loser and was also ranked last by any voter that did not rank it first.

Only in the last scenario does the actual winner and runner-up match the expected winner and runner-up.  As a result, this can be considered a stable strategic voting scenario. In the language of game theory, this is an "equilibrium."  In this scenario, the winner is also the Condorcet winner.

Dichotomous cutoff
As this voting method is cardinal rather than ordinal, it is possible to model voters in a way that does not simplify to an ordinal method. Modelling voters with a 'dichotomous cutoff' assumes a voter has an immovable approval cutoff, while having meaningful cardinal preferences. This means that rather than voting for their top 3 candidates, or all candidates above the average approval (which may result in their vote changing if one candidate drops out, resulting in a system that does not satisfy IIA), they instead vote for all candidates above a certain approval 'cutoff' that they have decided. This cutoff does not change, regardless of which and how many candidates are running, so when all available alternatives are either above or below the cutoff, the voter votes for all or none of the candidates, despite preferring some over others.  This could be imagined to reflect a case where many voters become disenfranchised and apathetic if they see no candidates they approve of. In a case such as this, many voters may have an internal cutoff, and would not simply vote for their top 3, or the above average candidates, although that is not to say that it is necessarily entirely immovable.

For example, in this scenario, voters are voting for candidates with approval above 50% (bold signifies that the voters voted for the candidate):

C wins with 65% of the voters' approval, beating B with 60%, D with 40% and A with 35%

If voters' threshold for receiving a vote is that the candidate has an above average approval, or they vote for their two most approved of candidates, this is not a dichotomous cutoff, as this can change if candidates drop out.  On the other hand, if voters' threshold for receiving a vote is fixed (say 50%), this is a dichotomous cutoff, and satisfies IIA as shown below:

B now wins with 60%, beating C with 55% and D with 40%

With dichotomous cutoff, C still wins.

B now wins with 70%, beating C and A with 65%

With dichotomous cutoff, C still wins.

Compliance with voting system criteria 
Most of the mathematical criteria by which voting systems are compared were formulated for voters with ordinal preferences. In this case, approval voting requires voters to make an additional decision of where to put their approval cutoff (see examples above). Depending on how this decision is made, approval voting satisfies different sets of criteria.

There is no ultimate authority on which criteria should be considered, but the following are criteria that many voting theorists accept and consider desirable:
 Unrestricted domain—A voter may have any preference ordering among the alternatives.
 Non-dictatorship—There does not exist a single voter whose preference for the alternatives always determines the outcome regardless of other voters' preferences.
 Pareto efficiency—If every voter prefers candidate A to all other candidates, then A must be elected. (from Arrow's impossibility theorem)
 Majority criterion—If there exists a majority that ranks (or rates) a single candidate higher than all other candidates, does that candidate always win?
 Monotonicity criterion—Is it impossible to cause a winning candidate to lose by ranking that candidate higher, or to cause a losing candidate to win by ranking that candidate lower?
 Consistency criterion—If the electorate is divided in two and a choice wins in both parts, does it always win overall?
 Participation criterion—Is voting honestly always better than not voting at all? (This is grouped with the distinct but similar Consistency Criterion in the table below.)
 Condorcet criterion—If a candidate beats every other candidate in pairwise comparison, does that candidate always win? (This implies the majority criterion, above)
 Condorcet loser criterion—If a candidate loses to every other candidate in pairwise comparison, does that candidate always lose?
 Independence of irrelevant alternatives—Is the outcome the same after adding or removing non-winning candidates?
 Independence of clones criterion—Is the outcome the same if candidates identical to existing candidates are added?
 Reversal symmetry—If individual preferences of each voter are inverted, does the original winner never win?

Approval voting satisfies the mutual majority criterion and Smith criterion when voters' preferences are dichotomous; this is because the winner will be someone that the most voters prefer above all others, or that ties with other candidates but the group of tied candidates is preferred by more voters than any candidate not in the group.

Variants and generalizations 
Some variants and generalizations of approval voting are:
 Multiwinner approval voting — multiple candidates may be elected, instead of just one.
 Fractional approval voting — the election outcome is a distribution - assigning a fraction to each candidate.
 Party-approval voting — voters approve of parties, rather than individual candidates.
 Combined approval voting — form of score voting with three levels that uses a scale of (-1, 0, +1) or (0, 1, 2).
 Score voting (also called range voting) — is simply approval voting where voters can give a wider range of scores than 0 or 1 (e.g. 0-5 or 0-7).
 D21 – Janeček method — limited to two approval and one negative vote per voter.

See also 
Instant-runoff voting

Notes

References

Sources

External links 

 Approval Voting Article by The Center for Election Science
 Could Approval Voting Prevent Electoral Disaster? Video by Big Think
 Approval Voting on Dichotomous Preferences Article by Marc Vorsatz.
 Scoring Rules on Dichotomous Preferences Article by Marc Vorsatz.
 The Arithmetic of Voting article by Guy Ottewell
 Critical Strategies Under Approval Voting: Who Gets Ruled In And Ruled Out Article by Steven J. Brams and M. Remzi Sanver.
 Quick and Easy Voting for Normal People YouTube video

Single-winner electoral systems
Cardinal electoral systems
Monotonic electoral systems
Approval voting
Rating